Progress Village is a census-designated place (CDP) in Hillsborough County, Florida, United States. Per the 2020 census, the population was 11,188.

Geography
Progress Village is located near the geographic center of Hillsborough County and is bordered by Palm River-Clair Mel to the north, Riverview to the east, and Gibsonton to the south. Interstate 75 forms the eastern edge of the CDP, and the western edge follows County Road 573.

Demographics

2020 census

Note: the US Census treats Hispanic/Latino as an ethnic category. This table excludes Latinos from the racial categories and assigns them to a separate category. Hispanics/Latinos can be of any race.

2000 Census
As of the census of 2000, there were 2,482 people, 853 households, and 622 families residing in the community. The racial makeup of the community was 6.69% White, 90.73% African American, 0.04% Native American, 0.12% Asian, 0.08% Pacific Islander, 1.09% from other races, and 1.25% from two or more races. Hispanic or Latino of any race were 2.74% of the population.

There were 853 households, out of which 28.5% had children under the age of 18 living with them, 37.9% were married couples living together, 28.1% had a female householder with no husband present, and 27.0% were non-families. 22.9% of all households were made up of individuals, and 11.5% had someone living alone who was 65 years of age or older.  The average household size was 2.91 and the average family size was 3.41.

In the community the population was spread out, with 30.9% under the age of 18, 7.6% from 18 to 24, 23.3% from 25 to 44, 23.3% from 45 to 64, and 14.9% who were 65 years of age or older.  The median age was 35 years. For every 100 females, there were 83.9 males.  For every 100 females age 18 and over, there were 75.7 males.

The median income for a household in the community was $27,708, and the median income for a family was $32,384. Males had a median income of $24,440 versus $21,521 for females. The per capita income for the community was $11,781.  About 15.1% of families and 18.4% of the population were below the poverty line, including 29.9% of those under age 18 and 14.8% of those age 65 or over.

History
Progress Village was Tampa's first low-income housing suburb. It was planned as a neighborhood for low-income residents outside of the city limits.

Progress Village Middle Magnet School of the Arts and Jack Lamb Elementary School are on the southern edge of Progress Village.

References

St Petersburg Times article that quotes one of the first homeowners in 1959 from Progress Village

External links
Progress Village Records at the University of South Florida Library

Census-designated places in Hillsborough County, Florida
Census-designated places in Florida